Andrew Lee (born December 1983) is a Korean-American entrepreneur. He is the founder of the VPN service Private Internet Access, which started in 2010. He is the heir to Yi Seok, who in turn is claimed by some to be the heir of the former Korean monarchy.

Career
In 2009, Lee founded London Trust Media (LTM), a private holdings company. In 2010, he founded Private Internet Access (PIA), a virtual private network service for anonymizing Internet traffic. He claimed to have started PIA because of his interest in Internet Relay Chat (IRC), whose users' IP addresses could be easily revealed, but only after the Freenode purchase. Lee and co-owner Steve DeProspero sold LTM (and its subsidiary PIA) to Israeli company Kape Technologies for US$95.5 million in November 2019. Lee co-founded Mt. Gox Live, a bitcoin price tracker that was later acquired by the now-defunct bitcoin exchange Mt. Gox.

In 2017, Christel Dahlskjaer, then the head of staff at Freenode, incorporated and transferred ownership of Freenode Limited to Lee; Dahlskjaer and Lee said the company was solely for funding the network and running the Freenode #live conferences. According to staff, they were not informed of the contents of the deal and were told that it would not affect Freenode's day-to-day operations, as the company only managed the conference and nothing else. A dispute over changes Lee imposed in 2021 resulted in all of Freenode's twenty to thirty staff members resigning. This team went on to form a new network called Libera Chat.

Personal life 
Andrew Lee was born in Indianapolis and raised in Carmel, a city in the Indianapolis metro area. He enrolled at Purdue University and transferred to the University at Buffalo, but later dropped out to start working.

In October 2018, Yi Seok, a member of the House of Yi and one of the pretenders to the defunct imperial throne of Korea, declared Lee the crown prince of Korea at a ceremony in Los Angeles, attended by Bermuda premier David Burt, and city officials from Los Angeles and Jeonju.

In 2020, Lee and his family moved to a mansion in Hidden Valley, Ventura County, California.

In the afternoon of November 18, 2022, J-Money, driving a Rolls-Royce Phantom registered to Andrew Lee, was shot and robbed by 2 men in Koreatown, Los Angeles. As of February 2023, the perpetrators have not been identified. Andrew Lee, under the rapper name KingLee, appeared on J-Money's album titled "Dun It All".

References

American people of Korean descent
Bitcoin
Businesspeople from Indiana
House of Yi
Internet privacy
Living people
Purdue University alumni
1983 births